Vanga Geetha (born 1 March 1964) is an Indian politician. She was elected to the Lok Sabha, lower house of the Parliament of India from Kakinada, Andhra Pradesh as a member of the YSR Congress Party. She was earlier a Member of Parliament, representing Andhra Pradesh in the Rajya Sabha the upper house of India's Parliament representing the Telugu Desam Party.

References

Rajya Sabha members from Andhra Pradesh
India MPs 2019–present
YSR Congress Party politicians
Telugu Desam Party politicians
Women in Andhra Pradesh politics
1964 births
Living people
Women members of the Rajya Sabha
21st-century Indian women politicians